The Australian New Wave (also known as the Australian Film Revival, Australian Film Renaissance, or New Australian Cinema) was an era of resurgence in worldwide popularity of Australian cinema, particularly in the United States. It began in the early 1970s and lasted until the mid-late 1980s. The era also marked the emergence of Ozploitation, a film genre characterised by the exploitation of colloquial Australian culture.

Background
The Australian film industry declined after World War II, coming to a virtual stop by the early 1960s. The Gorton (1968–71) and Whitlam Governments (1972–75) intervened and rescued the industry from its expected oblivion. The federal and several state governments established bodies to assist with the funding of film production and the training of film makers through the Australian Film, Television and Radio School, which fostered a new generation of Australian filmmakers who were able to bring their visions to the screen. The 1970s saw a huge renaissance of the Australian film industry. Australia produced nearly 400 films between 1970 and 1985, more than had been made in the history of the Australian film industry.

In contrast to pre-New Wave films, New Wave films are often viewed as fresh and creative, possessing "a vitality, a love of open spaces and a propensity for sudden violence and languorous sexuality". The "straight-ahead narrative style" of many Australian New Wave films reminded American audiences of "the Hollywood-maverick period of the late 1960s and early '70s that had just about run its course".

Notable films

1970s

1980s

Notable figures
Many filmmakers and actors launched international careers through their work in the Australian New Wave.

Directors
 Gillian Armstrong
 Henri Safran
 Bruce Beresford
 Tim Burstall
 John Duigan
 Richard Franklin
 Ken Hannam
 George Miller
 Russell Mulcahy
 Phillip Noyce
 Fred Schepisi
 Brian Trenchard-Smith
 Peter Weir
 Simon Wincer

Actors
 Elizabeth Alexander
 David Argue
 Ray Barrett
 Pat Bishop
 Steve Bisley
 Graeme Blundell
 Bryan Brown
 Tom Burlinson
 Terry Camilleri
 Chantal Contouri
 Barry Crocker
 Max Cullen
 Judy Davis
 Mercia Deane-Johns
 Jeanie Drynan
 Carmen Duncan
 Mel Gibson
 David Gulpilil
 John Hargreaves 
 Paul Hogan
 Harold Hopkins
 Wendy Hughes
 Barry Humphries
 Bill Hunter
 John Jarratt
 Hugh Keays-Byrne
 Bill Kerr
 Nicole Kidman
 John Meillon
 Sam Neill
 Angela Punch McGregor
 Bruce Spence
 Nick Tate
 Noah Taylor
 Jack Thompson
 Sigrid Thornton
 Roger Ward
 Jacki Weaver
 Vernon Wells

Others
 Russell Boyd (cinematographer) 
 John Seale (cinematographer)
 Dean Semler (cinematographer)
 Donald McAlpine (cinematographer)
 Brian May (composer)
 Bruce Smeaton (composer)

Legacy 
Several films of the Australian New Wave are regarded as classics of world cinema and have been ranked among films considered the best. Published in 2004, The New York Times Guide to the Best 1,000 Movies Ever Made includes Walkabout, Mad Max, Breaker Morant, Gallipoli, Mad Max 2, The Year of Living Dangerously and Dead Calm. In 2008, Empire magazine chose Mad Max 2 and The Year of Living Dangerously as two of the 500 Greatest Movies of All Time, ranking in at #280 and #161 respectively. The 2011 book 1001 Movies You Must See Before You Die features Walkabout, Picnic at Hanging Rock, The Last Wave, The Chant of Jimmie Blacksmith, My Brilliant Career, Mad Max and Gallipoli (winner of multiple AACTA Awards). Since its re-release in 2009, Wake in Fright has been assessed as one of, if not the greatest, Australian New Wave film.

The term "glitter cycle" refers to a subgenre of eccentric Australian comedies that came to prominence in the early 1990s, spurning a post-new wave revival of Australian film. These films are noted for their celebration of Australian popular culture, camp aesthetic, colourful makeup and costuming, and musical performance pieces. Prominent glitter films include Strictly Ballroom (1992), Muriel's Wedding (1994), The Adventures of Priscilla, Queen of the Desert (1994) and Love Serenade (1996). Other prominent post-new wave revival films of the 1990s include The Big Steal (1990), Proof (1991), Romper Stomper (1992), Babe (1995), Shine (1996), Kiss or Kill (1997), and The Castle (1997).

In 2008, director Mark Hartley released Not Quite Hollywood: The Wild, Untold Story of Ozploitation!, a documentary film celebrating the romps of the Australian New Wave of 1970s and 1980s low-budget cinema and includes George Miller, Quentin Tarantino and Barry Humphries.

Media theorist Theodore Scheckles argues that the post-1970 period of Australian cinema attempted to "revise the traditional Australian hero and problematize that revision" asserting the best films of this era will be viewed "as films, not as pieces of Australiana". Likewise Michael Walsh argues that the period represents not an "over nationalist" period of Australian cinema, but an adaption of Australian cultural tropes, culture and history to an American mass market.

See also 
 List of New Wave movements

References

External links 
 Film Reference Encyclopedia – "Australian New Wave: The Comedies"
 New York Times – "Australia Prides Its 'New Wave' of Films" article, 15 February 1981

New Wave
New Wave in cinema
Movements in cinema
1970s in film
1980s in film